Michael Sollbauer (born 15 May 1990) is an Austrian professional footballer who plays as a defender for Austrian Football Bundesliga club Rapid Wien.

Career

Barnsley
Sollbauer joined English EFL Championship side Barnsley in January 2020 after ten years with Wolfsberger AC where he made over 200 Austrian top-flight appearances.

Dynamo Dresden
In July 2021, 2. Bundesliga side confirmed that Sollbauer had joined their squad for an undisclosed fee and he has signed a 2 year deal with the club.

Career statistics

References

1990 births
Living people
Austrian footballers
Association football midfielders
Austrian Football Bundesliga players
2. Liga (Austria) players
English Football League players
2. Bundesliga players
SK Austria Kärnten players
Wolfsberger AC players
Barnsley F.C. players
Dynamo Dresden players
SK Rapid Wien players
Austrian expatriate footballers
Austrian expatriate sportspeople in England
Expatriate footballers in England
Austrian expatriate sportspeople in Germany
Expatriate footballers in Germany